Lori Norwood (born July 30, 1964) is a retired modern pentathlete turned sculptor. Norwood was the first U.S. woman to win a modern pentathlon world title when she won gold at the 1989 World Modern Pentathlon Championships. She won her medal upon returning to competition from a -year absence from the sport. During her career, she was named Amateur of the Year in 1990 by Women's Sports Foundation. After her retirement, Norwood became a sculptor and was inducted into the San Antonio Sports Hall of Fame in 2015.

Early life and education
On July 30, 1964, Norwood was born in Panama  and raised as a military brat. As a child, she lived in various parts of the world including Brazil and Thailand. She began her modern pentathlon career during her teens after a friend recommended the sport based on Norwood's previous experience with shooting and horseback riding. For her post-secondary education, Norwood attended the University of Texas in the early 1980s and competed in cross-country running. She later went back to the Texan university to complete a Bachelor of Fine Arts during the late 1980s.

Career
Norwood was banned from competition after testing positive for Gamma-Butyrolactone at the 1986 World Modern Pentathlon Championships. During her two and a half year ban, Norwoood resumed her post-secondary studies and returned to competition in 1989. Upon her return, she won back to back medals at the World Modern Pentathlon Championships with a gold in 1989 and a silver in 1990. With her gold medal in 1989, Norwood became the first woman of the United States to win a world title in modern penthatlon.

Outside of the World Championships, Norwood won a bronze at the 1986 Goodwill Games and a silver at the 1989 United States National Pentathlon Championships. She won additional gold medals at the 1990 Goodwill Games and U.S. National Pentathlon Championships. Her total of 5,604 points was a world record at the 1990 National Championships.

After her retirement from modern pentathlon in 1991, Norwood became a sculptor. She completed projects for cities in the Southern United States before going to Lawrence, Kansas in 2007. Among her works is a sculpture she made for the 2012 Summer Olympics titled The All-Around Athlete. Apart from sculpting, Norwood became a marathon runner in the early 1990s and won multiple races including the 1992 Austin Marathon.

Awards and honors
Norwood was named Amateur of the Year in 1990 by the Women's Sports Foundation. In 2015, she was inducted into the San Antonio Sports Hall of Fame.

Personal life
Norwood is married and has two children.

References

1964 births
American female modern pentathletes
Goodwill Games medalists in modern pentathlon
World Modern Pentathlon Championships medalists
Living people
American women sculptors
American female marathon runners
21st-century American women artists
Competitors at the 1986 Goodwill Games
Competitors at the 1990 Goodwill Games